The National Hsinchu Girls' Senior High School is a high ranked public high school in East District, Hsinchu City, Taiwan. Student enrollment averages around 2000. Students take Comprehensive Assessment Program for Junior High School Studentsto attend school. The campus is in Hsinchu City downtown where transportation is convenient, only 400 meters away from Hsinchu Train Station.

School History

 4.24.1924: Established with the name of Hsinchu State Hsinchu Girls' High School
 12.1945: Changed the school name to Taiwan Province Hsinchu Girls' High School
 1988: Founded Art Talented Program and  became one of the first girls' high school to have male students
 1996: Added Mathematical Talented Class, cultivating Taiwanese science talents, won national and international contests
 2000: Due to deleting province policy, the name was changed to National Hsinchu Girls' Senior High School
 2005: Added Language and Literature Talented Class

See also
 Education in Taiwan

External links

Official Website of National Hsinchu Girls' Senior High School (Traditional Chinese)

1924 establishments in Taiwan
Educational institutions established in 1924
Girls' schools in Taiwan
High schools in Taiwan
Schools in Hsinchu